Lingoes is a dictionary and machine translation app. Lingoes was created in China. Lingoes is often compared to its competitor Babylon because of similarities in their GUI, functionalities and most importantly being freeware.

Features and expandability

Dictionaries and encyclopedias can be installed on Lingoes in the form of new add-ons to extend its functionality. Add-ons for Wikipedia, Baidu Baike, Longman Dictionary of Contemporary English, Merriam-Webster's Collegiate Dictionary, WordNet, MacMillan English Dictionary, Collins English Dictionary and other cross-English dictionaries (e.g. Arabic, French or German) are available in Lingoes' official website.

The program has the ability to pronounce words and install additional text-to-speech engines available for download also through Lingoes' website.

Lingoes also offers a whole-text translation ability using online translation service providers like Google Translate, Yahoo! Babel Fish Translation, SYSTRAN, Cross-Language, Click2Translate and others. Lingoes offers to translate a text via a mouse-over popup, or by double-clicking the selected text.

Additional tools, termed as appendices in the program, include a currency converter, weights and measure units converter and international time zones converter. Additional ones, such as the periodic table of elements, a scientific calculator, Traditional Chinese and Simplified Chinese conversion utility or a Base64 encoding utility, can be added through the website.

See also
Comparison of machine translation applications
GoldenDict

References

DICT clients
Freeware
Dictionary software
Translation dictionaries
Machine translation
Windows-only software
Language software for Windows